Vitiaziella cubiceps is a species of flabby whalefish known from the Kuril–Kamchatka Trench and the South China Sea at depths of from ; it is considered as rare species.  The habitat of this fish is oceanic depth of 1,5-4,5 km. It is the only known member of its genus. This fish is named in honour of Soviet oceanographic ship „Vitiaz” (another species named after this ship are Gonostoma vitiazi Rass, 1950; Lycenchelys vitiazi Andriashev, 1955; Pelagocyclus vitiazi Lindberg et Legesa, 1955; Cypselurus vitjazi Parin, 1958; Diaphus vitiazi Kulikova, 1961; Benthodesmus vitiazi Parin et Becker, 1970; Monomeropus vitiazi Nielsen, 1971; Eustomias vitiazi Parin et Pokhilskaya 1974; Melanostigma vitiazi Parin, 1980). Type specimen had been caught first in 1949 by Soviet expedition near Kuril Islands. No females of this species are known.

References
 

Cetomimidae
Monotypic fish genera
Fish described in 1955